Spondyliaspidinae is a bug subfamily in the family Aphalaridae. Plant eaters, they primarily feed on eucalypts.

Genera

References

External links 

Aphalaridae